Mardakheh-ye Bozorg (also known as Mardakheh) is a village in Tulem Rural District, Tulem District, Sowme'eh Sara County, Gilan Province, Iran. At the 2006 census, its population was 389, in 105 families.

References 

Populated places in Sowme'eh Sara County